Le Cuir ('Leather') was a daily newspaper published from Paris, France, founded in 1908. Le Cuir was dedicated to covering issues relating to the leather/shoe industry and trade. As of the mid-1930s, U-J Thuau was the director of the newspaper and Charles Guénot its editor-in-chief.

References

1908 establishments in France
Leather
Newspapers published in Paris
Newspapers established in 1908
Defunct newspapers published in France
Publications with year of disestablishment missing
Daily newspapers published in France